Peter Helck (17 June 1893 - 22 April 1988) was an American illustrator who specialized in depicting racecars. He estimated that he had produced more than 600 sketches, drawings and paintings during his career.

Biography
He was born on 17 June 1893 in Manhattan, New York City.

Helck developed an early interest in automobiles, and as a boy caught rides with the race car driver who tested Simplex cars.

He attended the Vanderbilt Cup on Long Island in 1906. He studied art in New York City, where he could observe the new automobiles displayed in showrooms. His first sale was to the Brighton Beach Motordrome, and he was soon receiving commissions from the Sheepshead Bay Speedway.

Helck worked for many of the major automobile magazines, in particular The Autocar, which took him to England and to major races in France and Italy. In the 1930s Helck was commissioned by the Sinclair Oil Company to produce a large format road map. This map did much to build Sinclair's reputation and to promote driving for pleasure.

In the mid-1940s, he was commissioned by Esquire magazine for eight paintings depicting early motor racing. These did much to further interest in the old car hobby.
 
In 1941, Helck acquired the famous Locomobile Old 16 racecar, which had won the 1908 Vanderbilt Cup, the first American-made car to win a race against international competition. Helck kept the car in its original paint. Old 16 was given to Helck's son Jerry, who later sold it to the Henry Ford Museum. In 1945, he was elected into the National Academy of Design as an Associate member, and became a full Academician in 1950.

He died on 22 April 1988 in Boston Corner, New York.

Legacy
Helck was one of the founding faculty for the Famous Artists School. He also wrote and illustrated many articles, along with two books, The Checkered Flag and Great Auto Races.

References
Peter Helck Paintings - retrieved July 1, 2008
Peter Helck Biography
Peter Helck - retrieved August 3, 2006
Grand Prix Cars - Locomobile - Type 1906 - retrieved August 3, 2006
Tribute to Peter Helck

External links
Peter Helck artwork can be viewed at American Art Archives web site

American illustrators
1893 births
1988 deaths